Asad Raza may refer to:

 Asad Raza (artist), American artist
 Asad Raza (cricketer) (born 1997), Pakistani cricketer